Erovete Peak is the rocky peak rising to 1300 m on the west coast of Pernik Peninsula, Loubet Coast in Graham Land, Antarctica. The feature has steep and partly ice-free west and southeast slopes, and surmounts Lallemand Fjord to the west, Haefeli Glacier to the southeast, and the lower courses of Finsterwalder Glacier and Sharp Glacier to the south.

The peak is named after the settlement of Erovete in Southern Bulgaria.

Location
British mapping in 1978.

Maps
Antarctic Digital Database (ADD). Scale 1:250000 topographic map of Antarctica. Scientific Committee on Antarctic Research (SCAR). Since 1993, regularly upgraded and updated.
British Antarctic Territory. Scale 1:200000 topographic map. DOS 610 Series, Sheet W 67 66. Directorate of Overseas Surveys, Tolworth, UK, 1978.

References
 Bulgarian Antarctic Gazetteer. Antarctic Place-names Commission. (details in Bulgarian, basic data in English)
 Erovete Peak. SCAR Composite Antarctic Gazetteer.

External links
 Erovete Peak. Copernix satellite image

Mountains of Graham Land
Bulgaria and the Antarctic
Loubet Coast